The International Rally of Nations is an international Rally event held in México for the first time in 2009.

According to the organization, "the idea of this event is to bring the emotional side of the Olympic Games or the world cup to the automobile world with the possibility of several teams per country." The idea for the event came after the Rally Mexico was not included in the 2009 World Rally Championship due to the rotation system.

The event was won by Spain's Xavier Pons and Daniel Solà, with the two drivers amassing a total of 1067.5 points.

Format
This Rally has a special format since, unlike other rallies, time will not be added stage by stage. Each Special Stage will give points to the top 16 drivers. A team representing a nation will consist of two cars and the points scored by each driver will be added together to determine the Nations Champion.

According to the official rules:

"Points will be awarded to each member of a Team per each Special Stage or Super Special Stage completed.
The best-classified crew of each Team will be awarded points as Car 1, the second crew as Car 2. Each crew will be awarded points according to its overall position in the stage classification from the eligible crews (Competing for the Rally of Nations) in each Super Special Stage or Special Stage according to the following scale:"

The Team scoring the most points at the end of the Rally will be declared the
Winner of the Rally of Nations.

2009 Entries
There are some very important drivers, including former and/or World Rally Championship, Production World Rally Championship and NACAM Rally Championship champions.

External links
 Official Website

International Rally of Nations
International Rally of Nations
International Rally of Nations